R116 may refer to:

 R116 road (Ireland)
 2017 Irish Coast Guard Rescue 116 crash, a helicopter that crashed
 R-116, another name for hexafluoroethane, a fluorine compound and greenhouse gas